Anarkali Kaur Honaryar is a  Sikh Afghan politician. She is also a women's rights activist and a dentist, as well as a medical doctor.

There were only about 30,000 Sikhs and Hindus in Afghanistan, Dr. Anarkali Kaur Honaryar is one of them. She is the first non-Muslim member of National Assembly of Afghanistan.

Career
When Taliban was ousted in 2001, Honaryar studied medicine at the Kabul University. She has been a member of the Loya Jirga which choose Afghanistan's interim government after the decline of Taliban, and also an Afghan Constitution Committee member. In 2006, she became a member of Afghan Independent Human Rights Commission.

In 2010, Honaryar was elected for the country's Meshrano Jirga, and she was the first non-Muslim woman to achieve the milestone, she left from her post in mid 2015.

On 22 August 2021, she came to India along with other Indians who were rescued by Indian forces from Afghanistan due to the Taliban siege of Afghanistan in 2021.

Awards and honors
Honaryar is a well-known human rights activist and has been awarded with the UNESCO-Madanjeet Singh Prize for the Promotion of Tolerance and Non-Violence. "for her work helping women who suffer from domestic abuse, forced marriages and gender discrimination and for her commitment to promote the ideals of human dignity, human rights, mutual respect and tolerance in her country." Honaryar was also chosen by Radio Free Europe's Afghan chapter as person of the year in 2009.

References

Afghan politicians
21st-century Afghan women politicians
21st-century Afghan politicians
Afghan Sikhs
Civil rights activists
Living people
Afghan women's rights activists
Afghan people of Punjabi descent
Kabul University alumni
Afghan human rights activists
Year of birth missing (living people)
Members of the House of Elders (Afghanistan)